If Dreams Come True is an album by American singer and musician Ann Savoy, released in 2007.

History
Prior to recording her first solo album, Savoy performed professionally for many years with her husband accordionist Marc Savoy and fiddler Michael Doucet in the Savoy Doucet Cajun Band, an all-woman band The Magnolia Sisters and with the Savoy Family Band. As The Zozo Sisters, she recorded the Grammy Award nominated album Adieu False Heart with Linda Ronstadt.

If Dreams Come True is credited to Ann Savoy & Her Sleepless Knights. It includes blues and jazz standards Savoy listened to as a child in Richmond, Virginia. She was encouraged to record the album by her musician/producer son Joel Savoy. In an interview, Savoy commented, “A lot of the reviewers think it’s a Cajun record. I’ve made Cajun records, but this is another kind of music.” The album was recorded on analog tape at Joel Savoy's Studio Savoy Faire. His brother Wilson and several members of the Red Stick Ramblers also played on the album as the "Sleepless Knights".

Reception

Music critic Michael Berick, writing for Allmusic, praised selected tracks, writing that overall "Sometimes the performances do suggest an excellent lounge band to the extent that you can almost hear the audience applause after a solo. Still, If Dreams Come True offers a delightful, charming musical excursion of Paris' romantic Left Bank." Critic Tom Wilk called the album "a well-executed set of jazz-tinged standards that demonstrates her versatility as a vocalist." and noted the "all-acoustic setting provides a vibrant, intimate backdrop for the songs."

Track listing

Personnel
Ann Savoy – vocals
Glenn Fields – drums
Eric Frey – upright bass
Joel Savoy – guitar, fiddle
Chas Justus – guitar
Tom Mitchell Jr. – guitar
Wilson Savoy – piano
Kevin Wimmer – fiddle
Production notes:
Ann Savoy – producer, mixing
Joel Savoy – producer
Sleepless Knights – producer
Tom Mitchell Jr. – mixing
Brad Blackwood – mastering
Jillian Johnson – photography
Brooke Barnett – cover design

References 

2007 debut albums
Ann Savoy albums